Lakshman Sruthi - The Musical Consortium was founded by V. Raman & V. Lakshmanan in the year 2003.

Lakshman Sruthi Orchestra

The Lakshman Sruthi Orchestra is a Manual Orchestra founded by V. Lakshmanan in the name of Sruthi Innisai mazhai in 1987 with 10 students; since then, it has performed over 7,800 times in Tamil, Telugu, Malayalam, Kannada, Hindi, and across the world. This orchestra maintains completely manual orchestration: it does not use synthesizers or any other electronic equipment.

It was the first orchestra to carry out a 36-hour non-stop light music performance on 17–18 December 1994 at Kamarajar Arangam in Chennai, India. In doing so, it set a world record. The performance was inaugurated by Padmashree Dr. K. J. Yesudas and watched by an audience of 24,000 people. This audience included M. S. Viswanathan, T. K. Ramamoorthy, Isaignani Ilaiyaraaja, Shankar–Ganesh, Gangai Amaran, Isai Puyal Oscar winner A. R. Rahman, T. Rajendar, R. Pandiarajan and Ramarajan. As well as performing its own shows, the Lakshman Sruthi Orchestra also put on a show with the well-known playback singers Dr. K. J. Yesudas and Dr. S. P. Balasubramanyam performing together in Paris, France. This same combo was promoted all over the world, with a total of 14 stage shows so far.

Lakshman Sruthi Musicals
After the great success in light music orchestra, Lakshman Sruthi started their own musicals store in Ashok Nagar, Chennai, India the name of Lakshman Sruthi Musicals in 2003 and it was inaugurated by Padma Bhushan Dr. Kamal Haasan

More budding started founding various musical instruments in Lakshman Sruthi musicals and more musicians started connecting with Lakshman Sruthi and it becomes popular day by day so later the junction named by the public as Lakshman Sruthi Signal.

Lakshman Sruthi Music school
LS Music School started in the year 2003 and successfully completed 13 years of service recently and marching ahead to scale new heights. This school gained a very good reputation as one of the premier institutions in Chennai excellence in the feel to study music with more than one thousand students have been enrolled for the ongoing academic period of training in vocal and various music instruments. Course offered Diploma/Certificate courses in Carnatic, Hindustani, Light Music and western music recognized by the University Grants Commission (UGC) and affiliated to Vels University, Chennai, India.

Chennaiyil Thiruvaiyaru

Carnatic musicians and Rasikas of classical music, Thiruvaiyaru is also the place to go beyond the limitation of language, religion, caste, creed, and nationality and understand their true self through music. In 2005, Lakshman Sruthi promoted a platform for Indian Classical Music festival in Chennai, India in the name of Chennaiyil Thiruvaiyaru this festival provides a forum for established artists as well as new talent to exhibit their musical skills.

More than 500+ artists participated in this festival every year, and its held for about 7–8 days. Leading exponents of Carnatic music come to perform and to pay their homage to the Great Composer Sri Tyagaraja and watched by thousands of ardent fans of classical music.

This prestigious program has been inaugurated every year by eminent personalities like ‘Bharat Ratna’ Dr. A.P.J.Abdul Kalam, Padma Bhushan Kamal Haasan. Elaborate arrangements have been made to accommodate some 500+ artists to take part and render the eternal Pancharatna Kriti in unison. For this particular program, the stage arrangement will be a replica of the Thyagaraja Aradhana Mandapam at Thiruvaiyaru. Printed copies of the kritis are distributed to members of the audience, who can join the singing.

See also

 list of Indian classical music festivals

References
 Article title
 Article title
 
 http://www.chennaidecemberseason.com/2011/11/chennaiyil-thiruvaiyaru.html

External links
 Article title 
 
 http://www.chennaidecemberseason.com/2011/11/chennaiyil-thiruvaiyaru.html
 http://www.indian-heritage.org/musicseason/sch.html
 http://www.eventjini.com/chennaiyilthiruvaiyaru
 http://screen4tv.com/zee-tamil-to-telecast-chennaiyil-thiruvaiyaru-season-11/
 Article title

Music organisations based in India